Epiblema abruptana is a moth belonging to the family Tortricidae. The species was first described by Lord Walsingham in 1879.

It is native to eastern United States and possibly Canada.

References

Eucosmini
Moths described in 1879